Up & Down: Mukalil Oralundu is a 2013 Malayalam psychological thriller film directed by T. K. Rajeev Kumar. It is very loosely based on the 2011 Hollywood film Elevator. The story unfolds in a lift where nine people are stuck. Indrajith, Prathap Pothen, K. B. Ganesh Kumar, Rejith Menon, Baiju, Nandhu, Remya Nambeesan, Sruthi Menon, and master Devaraman play the nine characters who got trapped inside the lift. Meghana Raj, Vijayakumar, Jaikrishnan, Kochu Preman are the other important cast. The film is produced by V. Balachandran, R. Karunamurthi and Latha Kurien Rajeev under the banner of Blue Mermaid Picture Company. The script is penned by Sunny Joseph and Manuel George and camera is cranked by Jomon Thomas.

Almost the entire narrative takes place inside the limited space that is the lift and the entire storyline is set over a period of a few hours on a particular day.

Plot
The film unfolds after eight people and a child get stuck in the lift. They include the lift operator, a police commissioner, the apartment's builder and his dancer-wife, an alcoholic writer, an IT professional and his girlfriend, an American-returnee and a young boy, who intermittently keeps enquiring about his mother. They are on their way up to the top floor to take part in the building society's anniversary celebrations. Suddenly, the space becomes a sort of an altered reality. It becomes a place where the real becomes unreal; where emotions are raw and extra sensitive. It even prompts the very nature of the characters to change and secrets to be revealed. The entire plot revolves around a murder. Meghna Raj is murdered and her dead body is found on the top of the elevator. Commissioner who is entrapped in the lift investigate the murder case. He interrogates all those people who are entrapped with him in the lift. Later, it is revealed that the commissioner has plotted with murderer's husband to cover the murder up and hide the real murderer. The real murderer is Prasanna who is a dancer as well as  apartment builder's wife. She accidentally kills Meghna. She plots with Meghna to kill her husband.
Meghna invites Christy to writer's flat to have sex with her. While having sex, she messages Prasanna to come to that flat. Prasanna arrives and see her husband in compromising position with Meghna. Christy was lying on the top of Meghna when she tried to hit him with a stand. At the same time, Meghna takes a dagger to stab him from behind while they are entangled in an intimate hug. But, unfortunately Prasanna missed her target and instead hits Megha with the stand. Thus, Meghna dies. Meghna's intention was to avenge Christy for the murder of her husband. Christy cheated on Meghna's husband who was Christy's co-partner. When Meghna enquired Christy about her missing husband he intimidated her by telling her about the debts of her husband. He tried to assure her that he would relieve her off from those debts if she  slept with him. When she disagreed he forced himself upon her. He raped her. She somehow fled the city  and came back as a prostitute after four years to take revenge. She befriended the writer to get close to Christy.

She introduced herself as professional escort to Christy and willfully had sex with him. When this 'bang - bang'  went on for a while she became a trusted ally of Christy. When Meghna understood that Christy had indeed killed her husband she decided to kill him. The day on which she was murdered, she called Christy to come to writer's flat to have sex. But, Christy told her that he wanted her to satisfy a prestigious guest of him, not him.when she lustfully insisted that he should come to the flat for a while to 'bang' her, he agreed. She prepared herself to kill that person who ruined her life. She informed Christy's wife about all the wrong things he had done to her and plotted with her. When Christy arrived she took all her dress off and laid naked on the bed and invitingly extended her hand to him to join her. He took her hand and laid on the top of naked Meghna and started enjoying her. He was savouring her. That is when Prasanna arrived and changed the direction of the story. Prasanna confessed truth to Commissioner that she killed Meghna. Then it is revealed that Commissioner already know who is the real culprit. Movie end with the death of commissioner and Christy. The lift operator who had a soft corner for Meghna shot both of them to death while they were in the lift. Prasanna takes care of Meghna's child. Lift operator is arrested for the murder of Meghna, Commissioner and Christy.

Cast

 Indrajith as Thampuran, an ex-serviceman-turned-lift operator
 Meghana Raj as Vedikettu Deepa, a sex worker
 Master Ajai as Ajai,  Deepas Son
 Prathap Pothen as Edathil Govindan Nair, a writer
 Baiju as Simon Christy, a wealthy builder
 Remya Nambeesan as Kalamandalam Prasanna, Christy's wife 
 K. B. Ganesh Kumar as Salim Khan, the Commissioner of Police
 Nandhu as Cheriyan
 Rejith Menon as Charlie, a techie
 Shruthy Menon as Mitra
 Master Devaraman as Shanku
 Meghna Nair
 Kochu Preman as Chandrappan, the lift mechanic
 Basil Joseph as Assistant Lift Mechanic
 Vijayakumar
 Jayakrishnan as Surendran
 Lakshmi Sanal

Production
The script and dialogues are written by Sunny Joseph, Manual George and Indugopan. The three had discussed well about each and every scene in the movie. Rajeev Kumar says there was a consensus among the script writers and him as a director.

Major portion of the film was shot from Chithranjali Studios in Thiruvananthapuram where the lift was constructed using plywood, the insides covered with embossed metal sheets. Mohandas was the art director for the film.

When the script was developed, scenarists and the director felt that the scope of songs were less in it. Also they were apprehensive that the songs would affect the pace of the movie. So there are no songs in the film except a promo song. Prasanth Murali has done the background score with Quarter tones.

Soundtrack

The music of the film was composed by M. Jayachandran collaborating with T.K. Rajeev Kumar after Rathinirvedam. Ramya Nambeesan sung the theme song. Background Score was composed by the debutante, Prashanth Murali.

Release
Up & Down: Mukalil Oralundu was set to release on 17 May 2013. The date was postponed by a week even after giving the mandatory advertisements announcing the release of the film on 17 May in the popular dailies. The film released on 24 May. A critic wrote that ""Up and Down comes across as a good-watch despite minor, negligible doubts it leaves behind".

References

2010s Malayalam-language films
2013 psychological thriller films
2013 films
Indian psychological thriller films
Films shot in Thiruvananthapuram
Films directed by T. K. Rajeev Kumar
Films scored by M. Jayachandran